Koichi Kawana (Japanese: 川名孝一, born March 16, 1930, in Hokkaido – September 13, 1990) was a post-war Japanese American garden designer, landscape architect and teacher. He designed gardens in San Diego, Los Angeles, Denver, Colorado, Chicago, Illinois, Memphis, Tennessee, and St. Louis, Missouri. Some of his major works include the Seiwa-en Japanese Garden in the Missouri Botanical Garden, the Hannah Carter Japanese Garden and a dry landscape garden at Sawtelle, Los Angeles.  He designed the bonsai collection for the Pavilion of Japanese Art at LACMA in the 90s.

Biography
In 1930, Kawana was born in Hokkaido, Japan. He graduated from Yokohama Municipal University in 1951 and got a US citizenship in 1971. Kawana became a college professor and lecturer for 24 years at UCLA on Japanese art, environmental design, and Japanese landscape/architecture. Dr. Kawana founded his own design practice, Environmental Design Associates, a Los Angeles-based design firm in 1966. Dr. Kawana died on September 13, 1990.

Aside from lecturing at UCLA, Kawana designed gardens at several parks in the United States, mainly having a Japanese style.

Selected works 

 Redesign of the Hannah Carter Japanese Garden (Shikyo-en), 1969 
 Seiwa-en Japanese Garden in Missouri Botanical Garden, 1977
 Sansho-En in the Chicago Botanic Garden, 1972
 Shofu-en, the Garden of Wind and Pines, at Denver Botanic Garden,1979
 Suiho-En, the Garden of Water and Fragrance, at the Donald C. Tillman Water Reclamation Plant, 1984
 Seisui-Tei at the Minnesota Landscape Arboretum, 1985
 Sand and Stone Garden at the Bloedel Reserve, 1987
 Seijaku-En  at the Memphis Botanic Garden, redesigned, 1989 
 Dry landscape garden in Stoner Park, Sawtelle. 1989
 Pavilion of Japanese Art bonsai collection at LACMA, 1900

References

1930 births
1990 deaths
People from Hokkaido
Japanese emigrants to the United States
Gardening in Japan
Japanese landscape architects
American landscape and garden designers
University of California, Los Angeles faculty
Missouri Botanical Garden people